The Taught Course Centre or TCC is a collaboration between the mathematics departments at five UK universities aimed at providing a broader range of lecture courses for postgraduate students.

Members

The five collaborating universities are:
University of Bath
University of Bristol
Imperial College London
University of Oxford
University of Warwick

Lectures are given at all five universities and, using Access Grid technology, students at each of the other four institutes may participate with each lecture.

The TCC was set up in 2007 with funding from the EPSRC.  Twenty six courses were made available to students in the first year of the collaboration, with topics from diverse areas of mathematics including number theory, partial differential equations, random matrix theory, and group theory.  One of the aims of the project was to encourage contact between postgraduate mathematics students at the five universities and set up future collaborative work.

Configuration
In normal operation, the TCC uses access grid technology for video conferencing using the proprietary IOCOM software suite.  The lectures take place in the virtual venue named Maths TCC.  These lectures may be recorded upon request if permission from participants is obtained in advance.

TCC lectures normally transmit video streams using H.261 and audio as G.711 for compatibility with the freely available AG3 software.

Each Access Grid session is paired with a Jabber/XMPP session on the Access Grid Support Centre (AGSC) Virtual Venue Server. The XMPP session allows instant messaging with other participants allowing fault diagnosis or communication without interrupting a session.

Oxford
The Oxford TCC is equipped with a Smart Board and Sympodium that can be viewed locally and transmitted to all participants of the meeting.

Events
 January 21, 2008 
 TCC Number Theory Event Day was held at Bristol and students were given a chance to talk about their research to their peers and share ideas.

 May 21, 2013 
 Graduate TCC Conference in Number Theory was a successful continuation of the aforementioned event.

See also
MAGIC (postgraduate mathematics) a similar project with a different group of UK universities

External links
The TCC website
The Graduate TCC Conference in Number Theory website

College and university associations and consortia in the United Kingdom
Taught Course Centre
Engineering and Physical Sciences Research Council
Grid computing projects
Mathematics education in the United Kingdom
Organisations associated with the University of Oxford